Jalan Jerangau Barat, Federal Route 1689, is a federal road in Terengganu, Malaysia.

At most sections, the Federal Route 1689 was built under the JKR R5 road standard, with a speed limit of up to 90 km/h.

List of junctions

Malaysian Federal Roads
Roads in Terengganu